Barbara Faith (Kalik) Bennett  (born November 8, 1936) is an American Democratic Party politician who served in the New Jersey General Assembly from the 7th Legislative District from 1978 to 1992.

She was born in The Bronx in 1936 an attended William Howard Taft High School and the City College of New York. Kalik worked as a travel agent owning an agency in Willingboro and served on various local and county Democratic committees. She also served on the Willingboro Township council from 1965 through 1977 and was chosen as the township's mayor in 1974 and 1977.

First elected to the Assembly in 1977, she served a total of seven terms there. In 1991, Kalik and her running mate, newly appointed Assemblyman Jack Casey were defeated by Republicans Priscilla B. Anderson and José F. Sosa.

Accomplishments while in office 
Kalik is responsible for helping to secure funding for South Jersey Human Services, Transportation and Higher Education; the first garnishee for areas of child support legislation in the country; the elimination of tenure for superintendents in NJ; the workers compensation legislation for fireman on duty; and the basic banking bills.

Kalik was the first woman elected to Council in Willingboro, first female Mayor in Willingboro, first female President of the Burlington County Chamber of Commerce, first female elected to the Legislature from Burlington County, first female to speak at the municipal manager’s session at the league of municipalities, first female to serve as chair of the Assembly Appropriations Committee, first chair of the South Jersey Legislative coalition, and first woman to serve as Deputy Speaker.

Kalik is also proud to have removed the NJ Sales Tax from necessity items; secure $31 million in Federal and State funds to replace the hazardous Bridgeboro Bridge; instrumental in creating New Jersey Institute of Technology-Burlington County College, University of Medicine and Dentistry New Jersey and the Cooper Hospital-Coriell Institute for Cancer Research; allowed for direct deposit of state employees paychecks and for the Treasurer to wire funds; eliminated unconscionable delays in processing of state retirement checks; enabled more seniors to qualify for PAAD; pursued an investigation of public utility rates and costs; obtained funding for Spousal Abuse programs and Family Planning and day care centers; and eased restrictions on NJ wineries in the retail sale of their wines.

Kalik also made sure all workers, fire and emergency personnel, and citizens have the Right to Know about Hazardous and Toxic substances in their workplaces and communities, setting precedent across the country.

References

1936 births
Living people
Democratic Party members of the New Jersey General Assembly
Women state legislators in New Jersey
City College of New York alumni
People from Willingboro Township, New Jersey
Politicians from Burlington County, New Jersey
Women mayors of places in New Jersey
21st-century American women